The Ascendicate, originally known as The 7 Method is a Christian metal band from High Point, North Carolina. The band formed in 1999, but went on hiatus in 2012. The band put out tracks of one of their albums, which fell into the hands of Jimmy Ryan (Haste the Day, Trenches) and Ryan Clark (Demon Hunter, Training for Utopia), and the band signed to Solid State Records. They have shared stages with Staple, Extol, Alien Ant Farm, Disciple, Project 86, and Pillar. Guitarist Ryan Helm joined Demon Hunter, and then formed Damien Deadson.

Members
Current
Ryan Helm - Lead and Rhythm Guitar, Unclean Vocals
Eric Marlow - Lead Vocals
Dustin Bryant - Rhythm and Lead Guitar, Backing Vocals
Chris Wheat - Drums
David Dudley - Bass

Former
Marshall Jones - Bass

Discography

As The 7 Method
Studio albums
 Roses Like Razorblades (2005; MD)

Independent albums
 The7Method (2000)
 I'll Change Tomorrow (2003)

EPs
 Demo EP (2004)
 The Enlightenment EP (2005)

As The Ascendicate
Studio albums
 To Die as Kings (2009)

References

Solid State Records artists
Musical groups established in 1999
Musical groups disestablished in 2012
Musical groups from North Carolina
American Christian metal musical groups
Musical groups established in 2008
Metalcore musical groups from North Carolina
1999 establishments in North Carolina